Bi'r al Ashhab is a small village located at Cyrenaica in eastern Libya. It is located about 69 kilometres south-east of the capital of the Butnan District - Tobruk.

Notes

Populated places in Butnan District
Cyrenaica
Baladiyat of Libya